The 2014–15 season was Galatasarays 111th in existence and 57th consecutive season in the Süper Lig. The club were aiming for an unprecedented twentieth league title, after finishing in second place in the previous season.

In Europe, Galatasaray competed in the UEFA Champions League for a fourteenth season. They also competed in the Turkish Cup and the Turkish Super Cup.

This article shows statistics of the club's players in the season, and also lists all matches that the club played during the season. The season covered a period from 1 July 2014 to 30 June 2015.

Club

Technical Staff

Medical Staff

   Gürbey Kahveci

Board of Directors

Under the Presidency of Dursun Özbek

Grounds

Kit
Uniform Manufacturer: Nike

Chest Advertising's: Huawei (for League) / Turkish Airlines (for CL)

Back Advertising's: Ülker

Arm Advertising's: N/A

Short Advertising's: N/A

Sponsorship
Companies that Galatasaray S.K. had sponsorship deals with during the season included the following.

Season overview

 On 15 May 2014, it was announced that the Turkish Super Cup would be played on 25 August 2014 at Manisa.
 On 23 May 2014, it was announced that midfielder Selçuk İnan and striker Burak Yılmaz had extended their contracts until 2019.
 On 2 June 2014, it was announced that goalkeeper Fernando Muslera had extended his contract until 2018.
 On 11 June 2014, it was announced that the club had parted ways with manager Roberto Mancini.
 On 18 June 2014, Galatasaray revealed the pre-season summer camp schedule. The camp schedule for the Galatasaray professional football team prior to the next football season begam on Monday, 7 July at the Florya Metin Oktay Facilities. It was announced that Galatasaray would play two friendly matches against Bayer Leverkusen and Rapid Wien in Austria on 19 and 23 July, respectively.
 On 26 June 2014, it was announced that the club had extended their sponsorship agreement with technical sponsor Nike until 2024.
 On 30 June 2014, it was announced that Galatasaray had begun official negotiations regarding the transfer of Turkish professional football player Olcan Adın from Trabzonspor. It was reported that Olcan had signed a contract for four years. The original bid ny Galatasaray was reported as €4 million (plus defender Salih Dursun would be loaned to Trabzonspor for two seasons), with Olcan also receiving a salary of €1.6 million per year.
 On 2 July 2014, it was announced that defender Semih Kaya had extended his contract until 2018.
 On 3 July 2014, it was announced that Galatasaray had entered negotiations with former Italy coach Cesare Prandelli. Prandelli signed a contract for two years starting from the 2014–15 football season and would receive a salary of €2.295 million per year.
 On 8 July 2014, it was announced that young midfielder Kaan Baysal and winger Sinan Gümüş had been transferred from PSV Eindhoven and VfB Stuttgart, respectively. The contracts of both footballers had expired at their old clubs.
 On 10 July 2014, Izet Hajrović terminated his contract with Galatasaray and joined Werder Bremen on a four-year contract. Hajrović argued that he had not been paid his wages by the club and asked FIFA, the sport's governing body, to invalidate his contract. In response, on 18 July 2014 Galatasaray announced their decision to challenge this transfer by appealing to FIFA.
 On 11 July 2014, Galatasaray announced the 26-man squad for their pre-season summer camp in Austria. Manager Cesare Prandelli did not add ten players to the camp squad, who were either out of contract or transfer listed.
 On 15 July 2014, Galatasaray announced that the two forthcoming friendly matches against LASK and Bayer Leverkusen had been cancelled.
 On 16 July 2014, it was announced that goalkeeper Eray İşcan had extended his contract until 2018.
 On 17 July 2014, it was announced that midfielder Yekta Kurtuluş had extended his contract until 2017.
 On 18 July 2014, the home and away kits for the 2014–15 season were revealed.
 On 20 July 2014, it was announced that goalkeeper Sinan Bolat had joined Galatasaray on loan from Porto with a buyout clause.
 On 23 July 2014, it was announced that goalkeeper coach Cláudio Taffarel would be leaving the club to become the goalkeeping coach for the Brazil national team.
 On 25 July 2014, it was announced that defender Hakan Balta had extended his contract until 2016.
 On 5 August 2014, it was announced that Galatasaray had begun official negotiations regarding the transfer of Turkish professional football player Yasin Öztekin from Kayseri Erciyesspor. The original bid by Galatasaray was reported as €1.5 million, with Yasin also receiving a salary of €1 million per year.
 On 6 August 2014, it was announced that striker Sercan Yıldırım had been loaned out to Balıkesirspor for one year with a €1.3 million buyout clause.
 On 28 August 2014, it was announced that defender Dany Nounkeu had been loaned out to Granada for one year without a buyout clause.
 On 30 August 2014, it was announced that winger Lucas Ontivero had been loaned out to Gaziantepspor for the rest of the season with a €4.5 million buyout clause.
 On 30 August 2014, it was announced that midfielder Nordin Amrabat had been loaned out to Málaga for one year with a €3.5 million buyout clause.
 On 1 September 2014, it was announced that Galatasaray had begun official negotiations regarding the transfer of players Goran Pandev and Blerim Džemaili from Napoli. The original bid by Galatasaray was reported as €2.35 million for both players, with Pandev and Džemaili each also receiving a salary of €2.4 million per year.
 On 1 September 2014, it was announced that Galatasaray had begun official negotiations regarding the transfer of Turkish player Tarık Çamdal from Eskişehirspor. The original bid by Galatasaray was reported as €4.75 million, with Tarık also receiving a salary of €1.177 million per year.
 On 12 September 2014, Galatasaray announced a sponsorship agreement with Huawei and Turkish Airlines for the shirt sponsors in Süper Lig and Champions League matches, respectively. Huawei paid $4.13 million, and the Turkish Airlines paid €2.1 million for a one-year sponsorship.
 On 27 November 2014, Galatasaray announced the dismissal of head coach Cesare Prandelli. On the same day, it was announced that Galatasaray had entered negotiations with Turkey assistant coach Hamza Hamzaoğlu.
 On 12 December 2014, it was announced that Galatasaray had begun official negotiations regarding the transfer of Turkish player Furkan Özçal to Karabükspor.
 On 24 December 2014, it was announced that Galatasaray had loaned out Furkan Özçal to Karabükspor.
 On 16 January 2015, it was announced that Galatasaray had begun official negotiations regarding the transfer of Turkish player Veysel Sarı to Kasımpaşa.
 On 19 January 2015, it was announced that Galatasaray had sold Veysel Sarı to Kasımpaşa. The original bid of Kasımpaşa was reported as €0.4 million.
 On 22 January 2015, it was announced that Galatasaray had loaned out Dany Nounkeu to Evian.
 On 28 January 2015, it was announced that Galatasaray had loaned out Umut Gündoğan to Adana Demirspor for €150 thousand.
 On 25 May 2015, Galatasaray became champions of the Turkish Süper Lig.
 On 3 June 2015, Galatasaray won the Turkish Cup final against Bursaspor.

Players

Squad information

Transfers

In

Total spending:  €13.6M

Out

Total income:  €2.41M

Expenditure:  €11.19M

Competitions

Overall

Pre-season, mid-season and friendlies

Turkish Super Cup

Süper Lig

League table

Results summary

Results by round

Matches

Turkish Cup

Standings

Final

The final was contested in a neutral ground as a one-off match.

UEFA Champions League

Group stage

Statistics

Squad statistics

Statistics accurate as of 3 June 2015.

Goals
Includes all competitive matches. In the case of a tie in Total number of goals, players with more goals in Champions League are ranked higher, followed by league, Super Cup and Turkish Cup goals respectively. If all stats are the same, then the younger player is ranked higher.

Last updated on 30 May 2015

Assists

Last updated on 3 June 2015

Disciplinary record

Overall

Attendances

 Sold season tickets: 31,200

See also
 2014–15 Süper Lig
 2014–15 Turkish Cup
 2014 Turkish Super Cup
 2014–15 UEFA Champions League

References

External links
Galatasaray Sports Club Official Website 
Turkish Football Federation - Galatasaray A.Ş. 
uefa.com - Galatasaray AŞ

2014-15
Turkish football clubs 2014–15 season
2014–15 UEFA Champions League participants seasons
2014-15
2014 in Istanbul
2015 in Istanbul
Galatasaray Sports Club 2014–15 season